Becatti is an Italian surname. Notable people with the surname include:

Alessandra Becatti (born 1965), Italian heptathlete
Giovanni Becatti (1912–1973), Italian art historian and archaeologist

Italian-language surnames